Edward Alfred Cockayne (3 October 1880 Sheffield – 28 November 1956) was an English physician specializing in pediatrics. He spent most of his medical career at Great Ormond Street Hospital for Sick Children in London.

Cockayne was born in Sheffield to Edward Shepherd  and Mary Florence and went to Charterhouse School and Balliol College, Oxford before joining St Bartholomew's Hospital Medical School. He worked at the Middlesex Hospital and at the hospital for  children on Great Ormond Street from 1834. He was particularly interested in endocrinology, and rare, genetic diseases of children. In 1946 he recognized a disease that would be named after him, called Cockayne's syndrome. This is a rare multisystem disorder characterized by dwarfism, pigmentary retinopathy, impaired nervous system development, and facial abnormalities. This disease has since been divided into three subtypes:
 Cockayne syndrome I, or Classic Cockayne Syndrome: in which facial and somatic abnormalities develop during childhood. Due to progressive neurological degeneration, death occurs in the second or third decade.
 Cockayne syndrome II, or Severe Cockayne Syndrome: in which facial and somatic abnormalities are present at birth. Death usually results by the age of seven.
 Cockayne syndrome III: milder than Cockayne I & II, and its onset happens later than the other two types.

In 1933 he published the "Inherited Abnormalities of the Skin and its Appendages". This was the first book that dealt exclusively with genodermatoses (inherited skin disorders).

Besides his medical work, Cockayne was an entomologist and spent more time on it after his retirement in 1945, living at the Oasis in Tring. He amassed a large collection of butterflies and moths, which in 1947 was donated to the Walter Rothschild Zoological Museum at Tring, Hertfordshire. The collection which included those of Bernard Kettlewell had nearly 50000 specimens. Cockayne is also credited with influencing Kettlewell in the study of population genetics. In 1943 he became president of the Royal Entomological Society of London. He received an OBE for his work in entomology in 1954.

References

External links
Additional information on Cockayne's Syndrome (PDF)
Edward Alfred Cockayne @ Who Named It
NHM Cockayne Lepidoptera collection
Royal College of Physicians

British paediatricians
English lepidopterists
1880 births
1956 deaths
People from Sheffield
Physicians of Great Ormond Street Hospital
Medical doctors from Yorkshire
20th-century British zoologists